Gullane Entertainment PLC was a British independent production company which produced children's programming, including Thomas & Friends (1984–2021), Shining Time Station (1989–1993), and The Magic Adventures of Mumfie (1994–1998). The company was purchased by HIT Entertainment in July 2002, and went defunct in the same year. As of today, most of Gullane's library is currently owned by Mattel.

History

The Britt Allcroft Company
The company produced the first seven seasons of Thomas the Tank Engine & Friends as Britt Allcroft Company, after Britt Allcroft purchased the rights to The Railway Series in 1979.

In 1994, the company announced a strategic international alliance with Canadian-based company Catalyst Entertainment, who previously co-produced Shining Time Station with TBAC.

In June 1997, the company announced they had purchased the rights to Captain Pugwash and would produce a new television series featuring the character. In 1998, the company acquired the publishing rights to The Railway Series from Reed Elsevier.

In December 1999, The Britt Allcroft Company announced they had acquired a 50% stake on Sooty from then-owner from Sooty International Limited, forming a joint-venture company called Bridgefilms (also known as Sooty Limited), which would also handle licensing rights to existing Britt Allcroft creation Mumfie.

In March 2000, HIT Entertainment offered a $363 million bid to purchase the company, alongside other interested companies. In the same month, the company announced they had purchased The Media Merchants for £14 million, bringing Art Attack to their list of intellectual properties (IPs).

In September 2000, after the cinematic failure of Thomas and the Magic Railroad, Britt Allcroft stepped down as the company's CEO and soon, it was later reformed as Gullane Entertainment.

Gullane Entertainment
In September 2000, with the negative reception and box-office disappointment of Thomas and the Magic Railroad, Britt Allcroft stepped down as the company's CEO, and under new leadership, the company announced they would rebrand as Gullane Entertainment in order to expand and export their brands worldwide. Britt Allcroft would however remain as a creative consultant for the Thomas the Tank Engine franchise. Within the announcement of the name change came some new projects, including a new series of Thomas the Tank Engine & Friends, the launch of an online platform called Planet Gullane, a new series of Art Attack alongside the production of 238 episodes for the international market in a partnership with The Walt Disney Company, a second series of Sooty Heights alongside the production of direct-to-video Sooty material, two new seasons of Captain Pugwash, alongside new seasons for  ZZZAP! and It's a Mystery. Gullane also announced production of a full series of Eekhart with Catalyst Entertainment.

In October 2000, Gullane announced to set aside US$50 million to fund a year's worth of productions, including new Thomas-related projects and television movies, with one being a co-production with French company Teleimages for Animal Planet.

In January 2001, Gullane announced they had purchased David & Charles Children's Books for £1.1 Million, putting two new franchises: Zippy Dinosaurs and Vroom Vroom, into Gullane's properties.

In March 2001, Gullane announced their profits for the last six months went up 80%. On the same day, the company announced they would produce 26 new episodes of Thomas The Tank Engine & Friends for a Summer 2002 delivery, with a co-funding deal with a third-party being allowed to coincide with the series' cost at a possible range of 78 new episodes by the next three years. On the same day, Gullane confirmed that Thomas and the Magic Railroad had been sold in over thirty countries worldwide, while Catalyst Entertainment delivered the first series of Eckhart and Longhouse Tales to the company. Earlier on, Gullane announced work on a 2D/3D animated co-production with Catalyst based on the fellow David & Charles book Harry and the Bucketful of Dinosaurs called Sammy and the Dinosaurs which the company would distribute worldwide.

In July 2001, Gullane purchased Guinness World Records for £45.5 Million from their original owners Diageo, although Gullane would continue to license the Guinness brand name from Diageo. By December 2001, the company planned to produce new GWR-themed programming at a young male demographic, and that the publishing division had merged with Dave & Charles Children's Books to form Gullane Publishing.

On September 14, 2001, Gullane signed a distribution deal with Tell-Tale Productions for the production on two new shows, called Ella, and Sprogs.

In November 2001, Gullane was reportedly in talks to buy the entertainment assets of Canadian company CINAR, which had been affected by a financial scandal. However, those talks had fell through due to either a failure to secure sufficient funding or in-fighting within CINAR's board of directors.

In December 2001, Gullane purchased a majority stake in Fireman Sam from S4C International for £16 Million, with both companies agreeing to produce a new season of 26 episodes and to remaster the previous 4 seasons.

In February 2002, Catalyst Entertainment merged with Cambium Entertainment Corporation to form a joint-venture company called Cambium Catalyst International (CCI Entertainment), allowing Gullane to achieve economies of scale and add clarity to their operating profile, as well as adding onto their catalog with over 300 hours worth of programming. Gullane owned a 32% non-voting, 19% voting, interest in the new enlarged business.

On March 8, 2002, Gullane signed a co-production, distribution and global licensing deal with Collingwood O'Hare Entertainment for the production of a new series titled Yoko! Jakamoko! Toto!, which had been pre-sold to CITV. On March 20, the company announced 208 new episodes of Art Attack for the European and Latin American markets, alongside 78-new episodes of Thomas & Friends.

In July 2002, HIT Entertainment agreed to purchase Gullane for £139million. It would be unknown if CCI Entertainment would be effected by the purchase.

On September 18, 2002, before HIT's purchase, Gullane's distribution deal with Tell-Tale for Ella and Sprogs fell through, with the rights reverting to Tell-Tale.

After the purchase
In January 2003, Britt Allcroft announced she had resigned as a board director at HIT Entertainment in order to focus her work on her new company Britt Allcroft Productions and Peter Urie was appointed Group Head of Production to replace her.

In March 2003, CCI Entertainment announced they had ended their partnership with HIT, purchasing out their shares in the company, as well as most of Gullane's catalogue. The shows CCI reacquired were put into the company's CCI Releasing subsidiary.

In October 2007, HIT put the rights to both Mumfie and Sooty up for sale. Britt Allcroft reacquired Magic Adventures of Mumfie in March 2008, while Richard Cadell would purchase the Sooty franchise and brand in June 2008.

In February 2008, HIT sold the Guinness World Records brand and franchise to Ripley Entertainment.

As of 2020, many of Gullane's IP's still remain under the ownership of HIT Entertainment via Mattel Television. The "Gullane (Thomas) Limited" subsidiary remains as the IP holder for the Thomas & Friends franchise.

Programming
Thomas & Friends (1984–2021, Series 1–7)
Shining Time Station (1989–1993, 1995)
Magic Adventures of Mumfie (1994–1998)
James the Cat (1998 series)
Fireman Sam (1987–present)
Captain Pugwash (1998 series)
Art Attack (1990–2007, Series 13–15)
Sooty Heights (1999–2000, Series 2)
Eckhart (2000–2001, UK distribution)
Sooty (2001–2004, Series 1–2)

Other assets
Guinness World Records

Films
Thomas and the Magic Railroad (2000). Gullane's only feature-length film. This film features Thomas and his friends protecting a lost engine from the evil Diesel 10 and finding some magic. The film stars Alec Baldwin as Mr. Conductor, Peter Fonda as Burnett Stone, Mara Wilson as Lily, Russell Means as Billy Twofeathers, Didi Conn as Stacy Jones, and Edward Glen as the voice of Thomas.

Key people
 Britt Allcroft - Co Founder, Director, Deputy Chairman (resigned 7 September 2000)
 Angus Wright - Co Founder
 Adam F. Mills - Director (resigned 3 September 2002)
 William S. Harris - Chief Executive, Director (resigned 3 September 2002)
 Charles J. Falzon - President, Director (resigned 3 September 2002)
 Timothy J. Hilton - Finance Director, Director (resigned 26 October 2001)
 Helen Byme - Secretary

References

Notes

External links
 Mills to join Britt Allcroft [Productions] The Guardian – 1 December 2000

 
British companies established in 1987
British companies disestablished in 2002
Mass media companies established in 1987
Mass media companies disestablished in 2002
2002 mergers and acquisitions
Television production companies of the United Kingdom
Thomas & Friends
HIT Entertainment
Mattel
1987 establishments in the United Kingdom
2002 disestablishments in the United Kingdom